A vintage guitar is an older guitar usually sought after and maintained by avid collectors or musicians. The term may indicate either that an instrument is merely old, or that is sought after for its tonal quality, cosmetic appearance, or historical significance.

History
As early as the 1970s, musicians and collectors began to recognize the value of older instruments.  The rising mass production of both acoustic and electric guitars in that era served to highlight the quality workmanship and materials of the older instruments.  Historians, such as George Gruhn, helped to codify both the monetary value and sound quality of these guitars for both collectors and musicians. 

Examples of well-known vintage electric guitars are 1950s and 1960s era Fender Stratocaster and Telecaster and Gibson Les Paul. Older electric guitars in general have become desirable, including "budget brands" such as Harmony, Danelectro, and Kay.

Examples of well-known vintage acoustic guitars are Martin and Gibson models previous to the 1970s, and 1930s-era Recording Kings, among others.

Values of vintage guitars have risen considerably in the past thirty years, and are considered by some as a stable long-term investment.

Collectors
Joe Bonamassa is a well known collector with a massive collection. In 2018, Bonamassa has said that he has more than 1000 guitars and amplifiers.

Gallery

See also
Vintage (design)
Vintage musical equipment
Vintage Guitar (magazine)

References

External links

Some Guitars You Just Don’t Need
My Rare Guitars, Extensive collection of 1960s electrics.

Guitars
Collecting